Danny Healy-Rae (born 16 July 1954) is an Irish independent politician who has been a Teachta Dála (TD) for the Kerry constituency since the 2016 general election.

He is a son of Jackie Healy-Rae and brother of fellow constituency TD Michael Healy-Rae. He has worked in plant hire and owns a pub in Kilgarvan, businesses associated with the Healy-Rae family. Prior to entering national politics, he was a member of Kerry County Council from 2004 to 2016 for the Killarney local electoral area.

At the general election in February 2020, his share of he first-preference votes fell from 12.6% to 11.2%, but he was re-elected on the sixth count. In May 2020, he called for the Leaving Certificate to go ahead with proper social distancing due to COVID-19, possibly using community centres and public libraries.

Political views

Danny Healy-Rae has garnered a reputation for being one of Irish politics’ most outspoken figures, and has courted controversy on a number of occasions.

Drink driving permits
In November 2019, Healy-Rae gained attention for proposing 'drink-drive permits’ for people in rural Ireland. He proposed that this would help ease rural isolation and keep pubs open, allowing drivers to have two or three pints of beer before being allowed to drive home on designated roads.

Healy-Rae, himself a publican, also accused the Irish government of inflicting "damage and mayhem" on rural Ireland with existent drink-driving laws.

His comments in the Dáil were met with derision and disapproval by fellow politicians and road safety groups alike.

Climate crisis
Healy-Rae has publicly denied climate change on multiple occasions, stating that he "does not subscribe to climate change" and that "whatever we do on this Earth will not change the weather."

He began to promote climate change denial during 2016, when he stated during an interview with Hot Press magazine that his views about the climate crisis were based on the words of the Bible, claiming that the story of Noah’s Ark showed that weather events had fluctuated throughout the centuries. Healy-Rae also stated in the Dáil that "God above is in charge of the weather and we here can't do anything about it" during a debate on the subject.

His climate denial escalated in 2017 when he promoted falsehoods about the climate crisis being a money-making scheme and claiming that the measures put in place following the Paris Agreement were unfair. His comments wrongly conflated climate change with weather.

In February 2020 he issued a public apology having previously stated "to hell with the planet" during an interview with Virgin Media News when asked about his responsibility to protect the environment as well as his constituents.

"Vote for the people, stay with the people, and to hell with the planet and the fellas that says we must save the planet and forget about the people – I’m not one of those people, I make no apologies to anyone anywhere for that and I stay with the people as long as the people want me"

COVID-19 breach

In July 2021, Healy-Rae courted controversy when his pub was at the centre of an alleged breach of COVID-19 regulations after video and images were shared on social media showing a large crowd gathered inside the pub as part of a wedding celebration.

The footage showed a large gathering of people celebrating without wearing face masks (although these were not legally required), with Danny Healy-Rae pulling a pint at the bar during a time when the Irish government had implemented controls on the number of people able to gather indoors due to the spread of the COVID-19 virus.

Healy-Rae refused to comment on the Garda investigation into the incident, as did his brother, Michael, who was also present at the party.

Healy-Rae and his brother, fellow Kerry TD Michael Healy-Rae, have been trenchant critics of the government's COVID-19 policies, particularly for the hospitality and tourism sectors.

Same-sex adoption and abortion
Healy-Rae opposes abortion and was a prominent commentator against changing legislation during the 2018 Irish abortion referendum. During the referendum he was widely criticised for employing a number of shock tactics that were determined to be insensitive and for 'shock factor’.

He has also repeatedly affirmed that he is against same-sex marriage and same-sex adoption, calling it unnatural for a gay couple to adopt a child.

On the latter he commented, "What was I very worried about – and still am – is that two men, or two women, could adopt a little baby girl or a little baby boy and these babies would have no say in it."

References

1954 births
Living people
Danny
Independent TDs
Local councillors in County Kerry
Members of the 32nd Dáil
Members of the 33rd Dáil
Irish people of American descent